Talerddig is a village in Powys, mid Wales, located on the main A470 road between Llanbrynmair and Carno. It is part of Llanbrynmair community.

Talerddig cutting

Although the village no longer has a railway station, it is on the route of the 1863 constructed Newtown and Machynlleth Railway.

There was an accident in the cutting on 18 January 1921, of which several pictures survive. There remains a passing loop today on the single track Cambrian Line where  railway station existed until 1965. The passing loop was retained in track rationalisations of the 1970s due to the need to "pin down" the brakes on freight trains over the summit, and now a critical operational node for passing passenger trains.

Gallery

References

External links
Photos of Talerddig and surrounding area on geograph
1921 rail crash: Picture 1, Picture 2, Picture 3

Villages in Powys
Railway cuttings in the United Kingdom